(translates as "an opera for the imagination") is a 1993 French live-action animated musical anthology film, made for television. It has been compared to films like Fantasia and Allegro Non Troppo, and consists of 12 different segments, most of which are based on different popular operas. All of these segments are done in a greater variety of animation styles than Fantasia had done. It was nominated for best production at the CableACE Awards in 1994.

Program

Intro
The film begins with "Je crois entendre encore" (from Georges Bizet's opera Les pêcheurs de perles) playing, while screenshots from each of the 12 segments appear.

Segments
"Ladies and gentlemen. Or perhaps... Good evening, ladies and gentlemen. Welcome. Welcome to a gala for a very special occasion. Tonight, we are going to celebrate 400 years of opera with some of my very favourite pieces. I've invited a few of my best friends along, and one or two of my best enemies. You may know some of them already: Lakmé, Scarpia, Pagliacci. And who better to accompany us as we start our journey than the first great recording artist, Caruso? Oh, it's not as far as the Met, La Scala or Covent Garden; we are going to my 'Opéra imaginaire'. So, let's imagine."

1. "Vesti la giubba", from Ruggero Leoncavallo's opera Pagliacci, sung by Enrico Caruso (in 1902) in the aria's introduction and Franco Corelli (in 1960) throughout the rest of it. A stop motion animation based on the opera with a dark comedy theme and the characters rendered as circus-style clowns. A "happier" ending is shown with the 2D-animated ghost of Nedda reconciling with a rather obese Canio after he had "accidentally" killed her. Directed by Ken Lidster.

"You may have heard of the jester Rigoletto. Well, his daughter is in love with the Duke of Mantua. This is not a very reputable neighbourhood. But then, the duke is not a very reputable person. He's about to see that women are fickle."

2. "La donna è mobile", from Giuseppe Verdi's opera Rigoletto, sung by Nicolai Gedda. In the crimson heart of the wine in his glass, the (live-acted) Duke of Mantua embarks on a 2D fantasy in which he sees hand-drawn animated nude women based on those who come from famous paintings by French painters. Directed by Monique Renault.

"Oh, there's a lady who doesn't let much slip through her fingers if she decides she wants it. But, who will she choose next? Or will fate take her hand? Hey, Carmen, what do the cards hold for you today?"

3. "Avec la garde montante", from Bizet's opera Carmen, sung by Les Petits Chanteurs à la Croix de Bois with the Opéra National de Paris, and conducted by Rafael Frühbeck de Burgos in 1970. Carmen (live-acted) lays down her tarot cards which through CGI spring to life with the images the cards each depicting one of her choices from the opera: Don José, Escamillo, or Death. Directed by Pascal Roulin and Christophe Vallaux.

"They say that love makes the world go round. Well, Count Almaviva's house is certainly spinning before Susanna's and Figaro's marriage. Oh, such a crazy day. Oh, I can remember feeling just like Cherubino, the page; young enough to be allowed liberties and, uh, old enough to take advantage of them. Oh, love..."

4. "Voi che sapete", from Wolfgang Amadeus Mozart's opera The Marriage of Figaro, sung by Suzanne Danco. A tribute to Cherubino's cross-dressing adventures, rendered through paper cut-out style animation against CGI backgrounds. Directed by Pascal Roulin.

"Now, which one was it, I wonder? Aha! Ah, I should have guessed... Madame Butterfly, such a fragile creature. She's looking for something too. Looking and waiting for a ship, and her husband to return."

5. "Un bel dì vedremo", from Giacomo Puccini's opera Madame Butterfly, sung by Felicia Weathers. The story of Cio-Cio-San's tragedy is rendered through animation in the style of traditional Japanese watercolors. Directed by Jonathan Hills.

"Hmm... Ah, what do we have here? A pearl from a necklace, no doubt. 'Cherchez la femme' as they say. Now where... Aha! Ah, you really can hear the sea. And a song from long ago, of two pearl fishers who swore they would always be friends, and..."

6. "Au fond du temple saint", also from Bizet's Les pêcheurs de perles, sung by Nicolai Gedda and Ernest Blanc. A wispy, black-and-white, rotoscoped animation depicting a condensed version of the opera's plot set to its famous aria. Directed by Jimmy T. Murakami.

"Ah, here we are, the Magic Flute. And the search for truth and light. Will Pamina find Tamino, the man she loves, in the Temple of Ordeal? Ah, ah, ah! Patience, Pamina."

7. "Bald prangt, den Morgen zu verkünden ... Du also bist mein Bräutigam", from Mozart's opera The Magic Flute, sung by Lucia Popp. A 2D-style CGI animated, geometrical version of the scene of Pamina's attempt at suicide and subsequent discovery of Tamino in the Temple of Ordeal, with all the characters' bodies rendered in geometrical shapes on an ever-shifting stage. Directed by Raimund Krumme.

"What's that? Is it the Prince over there? Or perhaps, Dandino? It must be the day after the ball. But it's Cinderella's bracelet, not a slipper, we must look for. And everyone keeps on switching identities. Oh, what a tangle..."

8. "Questo è un nodo avviluppato", from Gioachino Rossini's opera La Cenerentola, sung in sextet in 1963 by Giulietta Simionato, Ugo Benelli, Sesto Bruscantini, Dora Carra, Miti Truccato Pace, and Paolo Montarsolo with the Orchestra of the Maggio Musicale Fiorentino, and conducted by Oliviero De Fabritiis. A sunny take on the opera and the Cinderella fairy tale through hand-drawn animation with the characters randomly assuming each other's identities, as well as those of characters from other fairy tales, including "Goldilocks and the Three Bears", "Little Red Riding Hood", and "The Three Little Pigs". Directed by Stephen Palmer.

"Ah, I do love a happy ending. Don't you? I think most people do. Oh, except this chap. He's always around offering... temptation, and taking your soul in return. Many like Faust live to regret the pact they made with Mephistopheles."

9. "Le veau d'or", from Charles Gounod's opera Faust, sung by Nicolai Ghiaurov. A hand-drawn, sketchy rendition of the ill-fated romance between Faust and Marguerite as the booming voice of Mephistopheles, who manipulates them like puppets, sings throughout the sequence. Directed by Hilary Audus.

"Still more celebrations. But, not even the tragedy of La Traviata will stop the Parisian high society amusing themselves."

10. "Noi siamo zingarelle", from Verdi's opera La traviata, sung by the Chorus of the Accademia Nazionale di Santa Cecilia of Rome, and conducted by Francesco Molinari-Pradelli. An unrelated visual version of the opera with stop motion claymation sweets attempting to bring colour to a world made of white cake. Directed by Guionne Leroy.

"Whoa! Well, I know that opera can be a very moving experience, but this? Ah, Lakmé. I can smell that jasmine. It is heavy perfume for a young British officer. And the jungle's full of dangerous secrets, as well as beauty."

11. "Flower Duet", from Léo Delibes's opera Lakmé, sung by Mady Mesplé and Danielle Millet with the Orchestre du Théâtre national de l'Opéra Comique, and conducted by Alain Lombard. A rendition of the opera in which Lakmé's arms and hands, through CGI, turn into various flora and fauna that are found in the jungles of India, including a tree, a cobra, a deer, a bird, a leopard, a woman's arm with bracelets, a rock, a human, a boat, a clump of reeds, and others, as Gérald (live-acted) meets Lakmé (live-acted) in the temple. Directed by Pascal Roulin.

"What the? Ah, of course. Baron Scarpia. Do you know the baron? Well, take it from me, you don't want to. And neither does Tosca, there. She's an opera singer, too. Now, I myself have sung with her on many occasions. The baron has condemned her lover to death. He's being held in the Castel Sant'Angelo."

12. "E lucevan le stelle", from Puccini's opera Tosca, sung by Carlo Bergonzi. An eerie hand-drawn animation depicting Cavaradossi's final hours of life observed by the angel of death and Baron Scarpia's attempted advance on Tosca. Directed by José Abel.

Ending
"Well, the time has come to leave my friends and their stories. But, of course, the magic of music can bring us back here anytime. There are no limits. Just... listen... and imagine."

During the end credits, the film closes again with Bizet's "Je crois entendre encore", while the same screenshots from each of the 12 segments shown in the beginning reappear.

Cast
Ana Lucia Alves as Carmen
Sébastien Chollet as Zurga
Franco Corelli as Canio
Alain de Greffe as Gerald
Mehdi Manglunki as Nadir
Bernard Marbaix as the Duke of Mantua
Fundji Ngelessy as Lakmé
Rubina Owadally as Leila
Ruggero De Pas as Narrator (James Smillie in English dubbing)

References

External links
 
Opéra imaginaire at Rotten Tomatoes

1993 films
1990s ghost films
French musical films
French anthology films
Films based on operas
Films based on multiple works
Animated musical films
Belgian animated films
1990s French animated films
British animated films
Dutch animated films
1990s French-language films
1990s German-language films
1990s Italian-language films
1990s stop-motion animated films
Films with live action and animation
Clay animation films
1993 computer-animated films
1993 television films
1990s English-language films
1990s British films
1990s French films